Cape Close is a cape on the coast of Enderby Land,  west of Cape Batterbee. It was discovered by the British Australian New Zealand Antarctic Research Expedition, 1929–31, under Mawson, who named it for Sir Charles Close, President of the Royal Geographical Society, 1927–30.

References 

Headlands of Enderby Land